

425001–425100 

|-bgcolor=#f2f2f2
| colspan=4 align=center | 
|}

425101–425200 

|-bgcolor=#f2f2f2
| colspan=4 align=center | 
|}

425201–425300 

|-bgcolor=#f2f2f2
| colspan=4 align=center | 
|}

425301–425400 

|-bgcolor=#f2f2f2
| colspan=4 align=center | 
|}

425401–425500 

|-id=442
| 425442 Eberstadt ||  || Eberstadt, the most southerly borough of Darmstadt, Germany, near to the castle Frankenstein, and first documented in 782 AD || 
|}

425501–425600 

|-bgcolor=#f2f2f2
| colspan=4 align=center | 
|}

425601–425700 

|-bgcolor=#f2f2f2
| colspan=4 align=center | 
|}

425701–425800 

|-bgcolor=#f2f2f2
| colspan=4 align=center | 
|}

425801–425900 

|-bgcolor=#f2f2f2
| colspan=4 align=center | 
|}

425901–426000 

|-bgcolor=#f2f2f2
| colspan=4 align=center | 
|}

References 

425001-426000